Mylothra forsteri is a moth of the family Autostichidae. It is found in Iran.

References

Moths described in 1963
Mylothra